Cobalt blue is a blue pigment made by sintering cobalt(II) oxide with aluminum(III) oxide (alumina) at 1200 °C. Chemically, cobalt blue pigment is cobalt(II) oxide-aluminium oxide, or cobalt(II) aluminate, CoAl2O4. Cobalt blue is lighter and less intense than the (iron-cyanide based) pigment Prussian blue. It is extremely stable and historically has been used as a coloring agent in ceramics (especially Chinese porcelain), jewelry, and paint. Transparent glasses are tinted with the silica-based cobalt pigment smalt.

Historical uses and production

Cobalt blue in impure forms had long been used in Chinese porcelain. The first recorded use of cobalt blue as a color name in English was in 1777. It was independently discovered as a pure alumina-based pigment by Louis Jacques Thénard in 1802. Commercial production began in France in 1807. The leading world manufacturer of cobalt blue in the nineteenth century was Benjamin Wegner's Norwegian company Blaafarveværket ("blue colour works" in Dano-Norwegian). Germany also was famous for production of it, especially the blue colour works (Blaufarbenwerke) in the Ore Mountains of Saxony.

In human culture
Art
 Cobalt blue was the primary blue pigment used for centuries in Chinese blue and white porcelain, beginning in the late eighth or early ninth century.
 Watercolorist John Varley suggested cobalt blue as a good substitution for ultramarine for painting skies, writing in his "List of Colours" from 1818: "Used as a substitute for ultramarine in its brightness of colour, and superior when used in skies and other objects, which require even tints; used occasionally in retrieving the brightness of those tints when too heavy, and for tints in drapery, etc. Capable, by its superior brilliancy and contrast, to subdue the brightness of other blues."
 Cobalt blue has been used in paintings since its discovery by Thénard, by painters such as J. M. W. Turner, Impressionists such as Pierre-Auguste Renoir and Claude Monet, and Post-Impressionists such as Vincent van Gogh. It is stable and lightfast and also compatible with all other pigments.
 Maxfield Parrish, partially famous for the intensity of his skyscapes, frequently used cobalt blue, and as a result cobalt blue sometimes is called Parrish blue.

Automobiles
 Several car manufacturers including Jeep and Bugatti have cobalt blue as paint options.
Construction
 Because of its chemical stability in the presence of alkali, cobalt blue is used as a pigment in blue concrete.
Sports
 Two Major League Soccer teams have cobalt blue as a secondary color: Real Salt Lake from its inception, and Sporting Kansas City on its home uniforms since 2008.
Vexillology
 Several countries including the Netherlands and Romania, and a U.S. state – Nevada – have cobalt blue as one of three shades of their flags.
Video games
 Sega's official logo color is cobalt blue. Sonic the Hedgehog, Sega's current mascot, was colored to match.

Toxicity 
Cobalt blue is toxic when ingested or inhaled. Its use requires appropriate precautions to avoid internal contamination and to prevent cobalt poisoning.

Natural occurrence
A single record of the compound concerns inclusions in sapphires from a single site.

See also
 RAL 5013 Cobalt blue
 Lists of colors
 List of inorganic pigments
 Cobalt glass
 Cobalt phosphate
 Blue pigments

References

Further reading
 Roy, A. "Cobalt blue", in Artists' Pigments, Berrie, B. H., Ed., National Gallery of Art, Washington, D.C., 2007
 Wood, J.R. and Hsu Yi-Ting, 2019, An Archaeometallurgical Explanation for the Disappearance of Egyptian and Near Eastern Cobalt-Blue Glass at the end of the Late Bronze Age, Internet Archaeology 52, Internet Archaeology

External links

 
 Cobalt blue ColourLex
An Archaeometallurgical Explanation for the Disappearance of Egyptian and Near Eastern Cobalt-Blue Glass at the end of the Late Bronze Age Internet Archaeology

Cobalt compounds
French inventions
Inorganic pigments
Shades of blue
Glass dyes